Henri Scheweleff (born 15 April 1983) is a retired Finnish football player, who played as a midfielder. He has previously played for Vaasan Palloseura, Örgryte IS and Tampere United of the Finnish Veikkausliiga. He has also represented the Finnish national football team.

References

External links
 Guardian Football

1983 births
Living people
Finnish footballers
Sportspeople from Vaasa
Tampere United players
Vaasan Palloseura players
Örgryte IS players
Ilves players
Veikkausliiga players
Superettan players
Association football midfielders
Finnish expatriate footballers
Expatriate footballers in Sweden
Finland youth international footballers
Finland international footballers